Lekvan or Lakvan may refer to:
 Lakvan, Germi
 Lekvan, Kowsar